Pingalwara is a house for destitutes in Amritsar in northern Indian state of Punjab. It is housed in a three-storey building near the main Amritsar bus stand on the National Highway no. 1, also known as G.T. Road. In this house all the handicapped/diseased people are provided such a shelter that is more like a home. The workers treat all like gifted rather than destitutes. Under the name of this building, there are many other places working selflessly for the same cause that are run by the main organisation. This remarkable institution is the real example of selfless good deeds. Children, widows and old people are able to find that little feeling of love at the most unbearable movements of their lives. The rising number of volunteers show that the people of Amritsar are controlled by the graciousness of the heart.

History 

Pingalwara was founded informally in year 1924 by a then 19-year-old Ramji Das who later became famous as Bhagat Puran Singh

Pingalwara is officially registered as the All India Pingalwara Charitable Society under the Act 1960, Reg. No. 130. Since the death of Bhagat Puran Singh in 1992, it is headed by Dr. Inderjit Kaur who is a physician by training and also runs a private maternity clinic in Sangrur, Punjab.

Services 

Currently Pingalwara has facilities for 1080 patients who are fed, housed and looked after thanks to generous support of various philanthropists. The unclaimed bodies of the deceased are donated to Government Medical College, Amritsar for research and teaching purposes.

The main branch houses the Administrative Complex, A Female ward, Children's ward, Rehabilitation Centre, Printing Press, Dispensary, Medical Lab, Dental Centre and the Common Kitchen.

See also
Bhagat Puran Singh

References

External links 
 Pingalwara Web site

Amritsar
Charities based in India
Organisations based in Punjab, India
Religious charities
1924 establishments in India
Organizations established in 1924